The Bonny Brook flows into the Mohawk River in Frankfort, New York.

References 

Rivers of New York (state)
Rivers of Herkimer County, New York
Mohawk River